Haute-Kontz (Lorraine Franconian: Uewer-Kontz/Uewer-Konz) is a commune in the Moselle department in Grand Est in north-eastern France.

The commune is located very close to the border with Luxembourg in the Pays de Sierck.

See also
 Communes of the Moselle department
 Contz-les-Bains

References

External links
 

Hautekontz